GOOD Music  (stylized as G.O.O.D. Music; a backronym for Getting Out Our Dreams) is an American independent record label founded by rapper Kanye West in 2004. The label signed an exclusive long-term worldwide label agreement with the Island Def Jam Music Group in 2011. In 2012, the label released its debut compilation album Cruel Summer. In 2015, Pusha T was appointed the president of the label by West, while record executive Steven Victor was appointed COO. On December 19, 2022, Pusha T announced that he was stepping down and was no longer on speaking terms with West.

The label has released two number-one US Billboard Hot 100 singles, "All of Me" by John Legend, and "Panda" by Desiigner; as well as nine number-one US Billboard 200 albums: Finding Forever by Common; Dark Sky Paradise, I Decided, and Detroit 2 by Big Sean; The Life of Pablo, Ye, Jesus Is King, and Donda by Kanye West and It's Almost Dry by Pusha T.

In 2022, Complex reported that GOOD Music is no longer a part of Def Jam Recordings and West's deal with the label expired. Its final two releases, It's Almost Dry by Pusha T and You Can’t Kill Me by 070 Shake, were released and distributed by Def Jam in April and June of that year, respectively.

History

2004–2007 

GOOD Music was founded in 2004 by Kanye West in conjunction with Sony BMG, shortly after the release of his debut album The College Dropout.

Ohio singer John Legend and fellow Chicago rapper Common were the label's initial artists, along with West himself. Legend's Get Lifted (2004) was the label's first album release, leading both the artist and label to tremendous success. The album received eight nominations and three wins at the 2006 Grammy Awards. The album contained the single "Ordinary People", which was nominated for and won the Grammy Award for Best Male R&B Vocal Performance and peaked at number 24 on the Billboard Hot 100. In October 2006, Legend released his second album, Once Again, which won Legend his second consecutive Grammy for Best Male R&B Vocal Performance in the song "Heaven".

Common's Be (2005), the label's second release, was the recipient of four Grammy Award nominations. The label later added GLC, Really Doe, Malik Yusef, Tony Williams and Consequence to its artists. West's second studio album, Late Registration, included featured guest appearances by every artist signed to GOOD Music's roster at the time of its release in August 2005. In 2005, West came across a young Sean Anderson, known today as Big Sean, before a radio interview. After performing a freestyle, he left West with a demo tape, and in May 2007, Big Sean was signed to the label. In an August 2007 interview with Billboard West expressed regrets over starting the label:

2008–2011 
In 2008, British singer-songwriter Mr Hudson was signed, following the release of his debut A Tale of Two Cities (2007). There followed Kid Cudi, and manager Plain Pat. Kid Cudi's debut album, Man on the Moon: The End of Day was released under GOOD Music on September 15, 2009. The album earned three Grammy nominations and was certified Gold by the RIAA. A month later Mr Hudson's solo debut, Straight No Chaser, was released.

In late 2010, West released several tracks featuring himself, and others members of the GOOD Music roster, in a free weekly giveaway known as, G.O.O.D. Fridays. In September 2010,  Brooklyn rapper Mos Def was signed. Shortly afterwards Consequence released a diss track and left the label. The following month Pusha T announced his signing to the label. Late in 2010, Kid Cudi released his second studio album Man on the Moon II: The Legend of Mr. Rager, followed by West's fifth album My Beautiful Dark Twisted Fantasy. West, Pusha T, Big Sean, Common and Cyhi the Prynce took part in a cypher at the 2010 BET Hip Hop Awards.

In April 2011, West signed American rapper and producer Q-Tip of A Tribe Called Quest. Kanye West also signed producer Hit-Boy, to Very Good Beats. In 2011, West signed Nigerian artists D'banj and Don Jazzy. In June 2011, GOOD Music signed their first distribution agreement, with Def Jam Recordings. Big Sean's debut Finally Famous was the first album released by GOOD Music with distribution by Def Jam.

2012–2017 

In late 2011, plans were announced for a release of a compilation album, later entitled Cruel Summer. The album's lead single "Mercy", was released on April 6, 2012, and features verses from Kanye West, Pusha T and Big Sean, as well as GOOD Music affiliate 2 Chainz. The album was also preceded by the singles "New God Flow" and "Clique", the latter of which peaked at number 12 on the US Billboard Hot 100. It features West and Big Sean rapping alongside Jay-Z. Cruel Summer was released on September 18, 2012. It was accompanied by the eponymous short film Cruel Summer, which was shot in Qatar; the film premiered at Cannes Film Festival.

In January 2013, Scottish record producer and DJ Hudson Mohawke, announced that he had signed to the production arm of G.O.O.D. Music - Very Good Beats. On April 2, 2013, Kid Cudi announced on Power 106 that he was no longer with the label, leaving on amicable terms. Cudi felt he was "underused" and would have preferred to record something particular for Yeezus (2013). On June 29, 2013, producer Hit-Boy of Very Good Beats announced that his contract expired and that he was no longer signed to GOOD Music. American Apparel model Kacy Hill was signed to the label December 2014, after appearing as a backup dancer on West's Yeezus Tour. In March 2015, GOOD Music signed HXLT.

In November 2015, West appointed Pusha T the president of GOOD Music, while record executive Steven Victor was appointed COO.
In January 2016, Mos Def retired from music announcing it in a freestyle released in conjunction with West's G.O.O.D. Fridays series. On June 3, 2016, Kanye West announced GOOD Music's upcoming album, Cruel Winter, in an interview with Big Boy.

On September 7, 2016, West announced that former Young Money/Cash Money Records artist Tyga, signed a record deal with GOOD Music. Later that day, Pusha T announced Atlanta-based rap trio Migos had signed a management deal with the label. However, in January 2017, Migos clarified that although there were discussions for a management deal, nothing had come to fruition. On September 9, 2016, the official GOOD Music Twitter account uploaded an image of an updated artist roster with the caption "THIS IS GOOD MUSIC". The image indicated that several artists had either left or been removed by the label, including D'banj, Malik Yusef, Ryan McDermott, and Mr Hudson. Later that month, in a radio interview with The Breakfast Club, John Legend announced that his fifth studio album, Darkness and Light, would be his last with GOOD Music.

GOOD was advertised as one of the headlining acts of the ill-fated Fyre Festival in 2017; however, the exact member(s) of the label that were to perform were never established.

In May 2017, Pusha T signed Francis and the Lights to GOOD Music. In February 2018, Pusha T followed up by signing Valee with GOOD Music as well.

2018–present 
In 2018, West revealed he would produce upcoming albums by GOOD Music label-mates Pusha T and Teyana Taylor, as well as Nas. Pusha T's Daytona, "the first project out of Wyoming", was released in May to critical acclaim, although the album's artwork—a photograph of deceased singer Whitney Houston's bathroom that West paid $85,000 to license—attracted some controversy. The following week, West released his eighth studio album, Ye. West has suggested that he scrapped the original recordings of the album and re-recorded it within a month. The week after, West released a collaborative album with former GOOD Music artist Kid Cudi, titled Kids See Ghosts, named after their group of the same name. West also completed production work on Nas' Nasir and Teyana Taylor's K.T.S.E., which were released in June 2018.

On October 29, 2021, Big Sean announced on Twitter that after 14 years, he has stepped away from Kanye West's G.O.O.D. Music label, saying "That’s a forever brotherhood, but business wise, I had to start getting a bigger cut! I worked my way out that deal." Afterwards, West would appear on the program Drink Champs hosted by N.O.R.E. and DJ EFN, where he would talk with them about different topics, one of them being John Legend and Big Sean leaving his label, where West would state "I already decided that when I die on my tombstone it’s going to say, ‘I deserve to be here because I signed Big Sean,’" as well as "The worst thing I’ve ever done was sign Big Sean." Before the episode, Big Sean said on Twitter "I just got asked to be on the next Drink Champs so I’m assuming Ye talkin’ crazy." And would also share a photo of him and West from after the interview and wrote "Was just [with] this man, he ain’t say none of that!"

On October 24, 2022, it was revealed that Def Jam had officially dropped both West and GOOD off of their label. This comes as a response to West’s recent controversies involving actions deemed as antisemitic and racist, though it was revealed that West was already released from Def Jam following the release of Donda as the album completed his album contract with the label.

On December 19, 2022, Pusha T announced that he was no longer on speaking terms with Kanye West due to controversies related to his antisemitic views and has stepped down from his post as President of G.O.O.D. Music and is officially off the imprint.

Artists

Current acts

Former acts

Presidents

COOs

Very Good Beats 
G.O.O.D. Music also has a production wing known as Very Good Beats; this serves as a group of in-house producers.

Current producers 

 88-Keys
 Benny Cassette
 Boogz & Tapez
 Charlie Heat
 Evian Christ
 Hudson Mohawke
 Jeff Bhasker
 Kanye West
 Lifted
 No I.D.
 Noah Goldstein
 Q-Tip
 Symbolyc One (S1)
 Travis Scott

Former producers 

 Brian "All Day" Miller
 Devo Springsteen
Don Jazzy
 Keezo Kane
 Keyon Christ (aka Mitus)

Discography

Studio albums

EPs

Mixtapes

References

External links 
 

Kanye West
2004 establishments in New York City
American record labels
Companies based in New York City
Contemporary R&B record labels
Labels distributed by Universal Music Group
American hip hop record labels
Mass media companies based in New York City
Music production companies
New York (state) record labels
Publishing companies established in 2004
Record labels established in 2004
Talent agencies
Vanity record labels
Def Jam Recordings